Resident Evil: Welcome to Raccoon City is a 2021 action horror film written and directed by Johannes Roberts. Adapted from the stories of the first and second games by Capcom, it serves as a reboot of the Resident Evil film series and is the seventh live-action film based on the video game series. The film stars Kaya Scodelario, Hannah John-Kamen, Robbie Amell, Tom Hopper, Avan Jogia, Donal Logue, and Neal McDonough. Set in 1998, it follows a group of survivors trying to survive during a zombie outbreak in the small town of Raccoon City.

Development took place in early 2017, after Resident Evil: The Final Chapter was released, with producer James Wan expressing interest in the project. Later, Constantin Film chairman Martin Moszkowicz said that a reboot of the film series was in development. In the same month, Wan was called to produce the reboot with a script by Greg Russo; subsequently, Roberts was hired as both writer and director and both Wan and Russo left the project. Filming began on October 17, 2020, in Greater Sudbury, Ontario, Canada. The film underwent reshoots in May 2021.

Resident Evil: Welcome to Raccoon City had its world premiere at the Grand Rex in Paris on November 19, 2021, and was theatrically released on November 24, 2021, in the United States by Sony Pictures Releasing. The film received mixed reviews from critics, receiving praise for its faithfulness to the first two games but criticism for its script, casting and special effects. It grossed over $42 million worldwide against a $25 million budget.

Plot 

In the 1980s, Claire Redfield and her older brother Chris are children living at the Raccoon City Orphanage. Claire befriends Lisa Trevor, a disfigured girl who has been experimented on by Dr. William Birkin, an employee for the Umbrella Corporation, who oversees the orphanage and takes children for his own experimental research. Claire escapes from Birkin when she is selected to participate in an experiment. In 1998, Claire returns to Raccoon City, hitchhiking in a semi-truck. The truck driver accidentally hits a woman in the middle of the road. While Claire and the driver are arguing, the woman disappears. The truck driver's Dobermann licks the blood left behind, and over time begins to foam at the mouth and becomes erratic. At a diner, rookie police officer Leon S. Kennedy notices that the diner's owner has blood coming out of her eyes. Claire heads to Chris's home to warn him about Umbrella's experiments, revealing journalist Ben Bertolucci as her source.

After Chris leaves for the police station, a child breaks into the house, running from his mother, who attacks Claire; both are erratic and bloody. Claire escapes from them on Chris's motorcycle. At the police station, the STARS Alpha team meet with Chief Brian Irons and he explains that the Bravo team went missing while investigating a death at the remote Spencer Mansion. The Alpha team, composed of Chris, Jill Valentine, Richard Aiken, Brad Vickers, and Albert Wesker, is sent to the mansion by helicopter to investigate. Unknown to his teammates, Wesker is an operative for an unidentified party, tasked with stealing Birkin's virus, using inside knowledge to navigate the mansion. Inside, Chris and Richard encounter zombies eating the bodies of the Bravo team while Brad gets bitten by a zombie and crashes their helicopter into the mansion trying to fly away. Wesker saves Jill from a zombie before leaving her; Richard is eaten while Chris battles the horde, reuniting with Jill. The pair flee into the secret passage Wesker unlocked.

Meanwhile, the truck driver, bitten by his dog, transforms into a zombie and crashes his truck into the police station. Chief Irons tries to drive out of the city but is fired on by Umbrella guards attempting to contain the outbreak. Returning to the station, Irons is attacked by the truck driver's zombie dog but Claire rescues him. Claire and Leon retrieve weapons and encounter Bertolucci locked in a cell, who is then bitten by a zombie inmate. The station becomes overrun by zombies, and Leon, Claire, and Irons escape to the Orphanage, looking for a secret Umbrella tunnel leading to the mansion. A Licker kills Irons and attacks Leon, but he is saved by Lisa who recognizes Claire and gives them the keys to the secret passage. The pair discover the secret lab where Umbrella was experimenting on children like the Ashford Twins. Wesker encounters Dr. Birkin and his family deep inside the building. In the ensuing scuffle, Wesker is shot by Birkin, shoots him back, and then kills Birkin's wife in self-defense. When Wesker hesitates to pull the trigger on their child Sherry, Jill shoots Wesker.

Before dying, Wesker tells Jill to escape via the underground train before the Umbrella Corporation destroys the city, while Birkin injects himself with the "G-Virus". Birkin begins to mutate and attacks Chris, before being shot down by Claire who has arrived at the lab with Leon. Chris, Sherry, Jill, Claire and Leon escape and board the train, but are derailed when Raccoon City and the Spencer Mansion are destroyed, allowing a mutated monster version of Birkin to reach them. It attacks the train and grabs Claire, but she stabs its face with her knife and gets released. Chris shoots the monster but runs out of bullets; Leon then destroys it with a rocket launcher. As the Corporation states that there were zero civilian survivors in the aftermath of the destruction, the five survivors walk out of the train tunnel, leaving Raccoon City behind. In a mid-credits scene, Wesker awakens in a body bag, unable to see anything. A mysterious figure hands him sunglasses and introduces herself as Ada Wong.

Cast 
 Kaya Scodelario as Claire Redfield, Chris's estranged younger sister who is investigating the Umbrella Corporation
 Lily Gail Reid as young Claire Redfield
 Hannah John-Kamen as Jill Valentine, a member of the STARS (Special Tactics And Rescue Service) Alpha Team and Chris's partner
 Robbie Amell as Chris Redfield, Claire's estranged older brother and a member of the STARS Alpha Team who is dispatched to investigate the Spencer Mansion
 Daxton Grey Gujral as young Chris Redfield
 Tom Hopper as Albert Wesker, a member of the STARS Alpha Team who is working as a double agent for a rival company
 Avan Jogia as Leon S. Kennedy, a Raccoon City Police Department (RPD) rookie who teams up with Claire and Irons to escape the city
 Donal Logue as Brian Irons, the RPD's chief of police
 Neal McDonough as William Birkin, one of the leaders of Umbrella's experiments.

Additionally, Lily Gao cameos as Ada Wong, a mysterious spy, during a mid-credits scene. Marina Mazepa portrays Lisa Trevor, one of Umbrella's experiments. Janet Porter plays Annette Birkin, William's wife, and Holly De Barros portrays Sherry Birkin, their daughter. Chad Rook portrays Richard Aiken, and Nathan Dales plays Brad Vickers, two members of the STARS Alpha Team, while Sammy Azero appears as Enrico Marini, and Dylan Taylor as Kevin Dooley, two members of the STARS Bravo Team. Josh Cruddas portrays Ben Bertolucci, a conspiracy theorist investigating the Umbrella Corporation, and Pat Thornton plays the trucker who helps Claire. Héloïse Catherine and Sophia Ann Pead Gavin appear as Alexia and Alfred Ashford, respectively.

Production

Writing

Greg Russo's version
Pre-production took place in early 2017 while Resident Evil: The Final Chapter was still in theatres, with Constantin Film chairman Martin Moszkowicz saying that a reboot of the series was in development, and producer James Wan expressing interest in the project. Greg Russo was attached as writer in 2017. Russo, who was also attached to write the script for Mortal Kombat (2021) at the time, worked with Wan in creating a Resident Evil story he considered to be "brutal and horrifying", and drew inspiration from the 2017 video game Resident Evil 7: Biohazard, though he would later clarify he only drew on the tones of the game – "scary, isolated, alone" – rather than the story itself. Russo wanted Moonlight Sonata, a composition featured in several Resident Evil games, to feature in the opening credits. At one point, it would have been an actual sequel to the game continuing on from Ethan and Mia Winters' experiences in Louisiana. Constantin, however, was not happy with this script, feeling the game was too recent and its potential failure could harm film sales. Seeking alternate story ideas, Constantin proposed the incorporation at one point of time-travel. Ultimately, Wan and Russo decided to leave the project citing creative differences and their departures were confirmed at the end of 2018.

Johannes Roberts' version

In December 2018, it was announced that Johannes Roberts was attached to write and direct the film. In August 2019, Roberts told Screen Rant that the reboot would be "super, super scary" and more faithful to the games than the previous films. In a statement to Deadline Hollywood, Roberts said the film would be based on Resident Evil (1996) and Resident Evil 2 (1998), and producer Robert Kulzer stated, "After a dozen games, six live-action movies and hundreds of pages of fan fiction, we felt compelled to return to the year 1998, to explore the secrets hidden in the walls of the Spencer Mansion and Raccoon City."

Roberts said he wanted to give the film a darker tone. Inspired by John Carpenter's films, including Halloween, Assault on Precinct 13, and The Fog, the filmmaker explained that the story was divided between two main locations: Spencer Mansion from the first game and the Raccoon Police Department, which first appeared in Resident Evil 2. Roberts chose the tone for the remake of the second game as a model for the film. Although director Paul W. S. Anderson and Milla Jovovich released six commercially successful films based on the games between 2002 and 2017, Roberts emphasized that his version was different from the series that preceded it: 

In early drafts, the screenplay was ambitious, incorporating a variety of mutants from the first two games into the narrative even if only passively. The story was from the start intended as an ensemble piece comparable to Resident Evil: Apocalypse, following several major characters in the film as their paths converge. Over the course of 2019 and 2020 the film script was repeatedly altered, keeping the main story but removing a number of CG-heavy elements, condensing the supporting cast and tweaking the protagonists' arcs. Earlier drafts also included more original characters, monsters and locations from the games, before Roberts had to make changes to his script after the budget was cut from $40 million to $25 million. Some of the cuts and changes were made so late that most of the concept artwork done by Daniel Carrasco for the monsters to be featured was finished, including Hunters, Chimeras, Crimson Heads, Pale Heads, giant spiders, Neptune (giant shark), Tyrant (aka Mr. X), and others.

Originally, Claire and Chris had no connection with Birkin or Ben Bertolucci, this was added later to help streamline the story after other script changes. The characters were also closer to their original video game versions; Jill wasn't written as a reckless wildcard and Claire wasn't a conspiracy theorist who already knew of Umbrella's intentions. Barry Burton, Rebecca Chambers and other characters from the games were originally in the scripts, and some had death scenes written for them. Some of the action scenes were cut down or changed, mostly due to budget cuts, such as a scene where Lisa Trevor sacrifices herself attacking Birkin while everyone else escapes on the train.

Casting
In early 2020, casting was underway but was delayed by the COVID-19 pandemic. In April, Full Circle Cinema reported that the studio was eyeing Brenton Thwaites, Kaya Scodelario, and Harris Dickinson for the roles of the Redfield siblings Chris and Claire and Leon S. Kennedy. On October 6, Deadline Hollywood reported that Scodelario and Hannah John-Kamen had been cast as Claire and Jill Valentine, alongside Robbie Amell, Tom Hopper, Avan Jogia, and Neal McDonough as Chris Redfield, Albert Wesker, Leon S. Kennedy, and William Birkin, respectively. That November, Donal Logue was cast as Chief Brian Irons, alongside Chad Rook as Richard Aiken, and Lily Gao as Ada Wong.

In Japan, Capcom later confirmed the characters will be dubbed by voice actors different from the Anderson films. For example, Chris and Claire are voiced by Subaru Kimura and Fairouz Ai instead of Hiroki Tōchi and Hiroe Oka.

Filming 
Principal photography began in Greater Sudbury, Ontario, Canada on October 17, 2020, with Maxime Alexandre serving as cinematographer. Filming was completed on December 24, 2020. In March 2021, Roberts revealed the full title as Resident Evil: Welcome to Raccoon City. In May 2021, Amell revealed that the film was undergoing reshoots in Toronto and Hamilton.

Music
The film score was composed by Mark Korven. Milan Records and Sony Classical has released the soundtrack.

Release

Marketing
Official images of the film were released on August 31, 2021, and were met with a mixed response. A trailer was released on October 7, 2021, and was met with mixed reaction from fans, who praised its faithfulness to the first two games, but criticized its casting and special effects. Prior to the film's release, the characters were criticized by Metro based on the film's trailer, who called them "bad cosplay" and further said that their acting was "too authentic to the games". Summarizing the film's marketing results, RelishMix said fans of the franchise noticed Milla Jovovich absence while "questioning the logic, the look of the effects, and comparing the film to the game's CGI."

Theatrical
Resident Evil: Welcome to Raccoon City had its world premiere at the Grand Rex in Paris, France on November 19, 2021, but was theatrically released on November 24, 2021, by Sony Pictures Releasing in the United States. It was delayed from its original release dates of September 3 and 9, 2021. The film was a modest financial success.

Home media
Resident Evil: Welcome to Raccoon City was released on video-on-demand on December 21, 2021, and was the top-rented film on Vudu during its first weekend. The film was released on DVD, Blu-ray and Ultra HD Blu-ray on February 8, 2022 by Sony Pictures Home Entertainment. The film grossed over $3.4 million from North America video sales.

Reception

Box office 
Resident Evil: Welcome to Raccoon City grossed $17 million in the United States and Canada, and $25 million in other territories, for a worldwide total of $42 million.

In the United States and Canada, the film was released alongside House of Gucci and Encanto, and was projected to gross $8–10 million from 2,803 theaters over its five-day opening weekend. The film opened nationwide on Wednesday, November 24, 2021, and made $2.5 million on its first day—including $935,000 from Tuesday night previews—from a total of 225,000 theater admissions. The film went on to make $8.85 million in its first five days, placing fifth. Audiences were 64% male as well as 68% between the ages of 18 and 34. In its second weekend, the film earned $2.69 million. In its third, the film made $1.66 million and finished sixth at the box office. The film was tenth in its fourth weekend, earning $316,480 from 719 theaters.

Outside the U.S. and Canada, the film earned $5.1 million from 15 markets in its opening weekend. It made $4.2 million in its second weekend and $2.3 million in its third. In Thailand, the film earned $253,735 from the box office. Japan was the film's highest-grossing foreign market, contributing $5.1 million from the box office.

Critical response
On the review aggregator website Rotten Tomatoes, the film has an approval rating of 30% based on 87 reviews, with an average rating of 4.8/10. The site's critical consensus reads, "Resident Evil: Welcome to Raccoon City is an affectionately faithful adaptation that further proves its source material is ill-suited to the big screen."  Audiences polled by CinemaScore gave the film an average grade of "C+" on an A+ to F scale, while those at PostTrak gave it a 61% positive score, with 48% saying they would definitely recommend it.

In a positive review, Johnny Oleksinski from the New York Post gave 3 out of 4 stars and said the film is "empty-headed good fun that’s blessedly under two hours and has just enough character development to make you kind of care when someone gets bitten." Ferdosa Abdi from ScreenRant called it a "fun and faithful adaptation of the games", but felt it was "lacking in character substance." Sean Keane from CNET praised the film: "Despite the lack of scares, minor tweaks to the games' lore and overall silliness, director Johannes Roberts' love for Resident Evil is clear in every moment of Welcome to Raccoon City. With a barrage of Easter eggs and fascinating takes on classic characters, the film's a gleeful trip back to the Spencer Mansion and Raccoon Police Department aimed squarely at fans."

Taylor Lyles of IGN gave the film a 6/10 score, explaining, "Director Mr. Roberts does deserve some credit for sticking much more closely to the source material than the Paul W. S. Anderson films, but a short runtime, a rushed third act, and lack of elements to make it truly scary to watch in the dark hold it back immensely. Nevertheless, it should serve as decent fun for fans". In a mixed review, Mark Hanson from SLANT wrote "Roberts clearly establishes the hauntingly depressed industrial environment of Raccoon City while methodically spacing out his zombie attacks, which, while not especially innovative, at times put a pit in your stomach like the Resident Evil games do."

Charles Bramesco from The A.V. Club gave the film a C+ and called it "totally bereft of the visual distinction or creative personality that often made its predecessors intriguing diamonds in the rough". Nick Schager from Variety criticized the "bevy of unexplained details, dropped subplots, paper-thin characterizations and fright-free mayhem." Kimberly Myers from the Los Angeles Times also gave a negative review, noting the film "may reward longtime fans of the video games by returning to the series' origins, but others will find themselves wanting to leave town, much like the movie's characters."

Future
Director Johannes Roberts stated that if a sequel were to be developed, he would like to adapt the story from Resident Evil – Code: Veronica and then Resident Evil 4. He also expressed interest in adapting Resident Evil 7: Biohazard and Resident Evil Village in the future.

Robbie Amell stated he hoped to return as Chris in a sequel that included his boulder-punching scene from Resident Evil 5. By June 2022, Tom Hopper confirmed Sony and Constantin Films were pleased with the film's success on video-on-demand and said he hoped to play Albert Wesker again.

See also
 List of films based on video games

References

External links
 
 

2021 films
2021 science fiction action films
2021 science fiction horror films
2020s action horror films
2020s English-language films
2020s monster movies
American action horror films
American haunted house films
American monster movies
American science fiction action films
American science fiction horror films
American zombie films
British action horror films
British haunted house films
British monster movies
British science fiction action films
British science fiction horror films
British zombie films
Canadian action horror films
Canadian monster movies
Canadian science fiction action films
Canadian science fiction horror films
Canadian zombie films
Constantin Film films
English-language Canadian films
English-language German films
Films about police officers
Films about viral outbreaks
Films directed by Johannes Roberts
Films impacted by the COVID-19 pandemic
Films scored by Mark Korven
Films set in the 1980s
Films set in 1998
Films set in country houses
Films set in orphanages
Films set in the United States
Films shot in Greater Sudbury
Films shot in Toronto
Films with screenplays by Johannes Roberts
German action horror films
German monster movies
German science fiction action films
German science fiction horror films
German zombie films
Girls with guns films
Live-action films based on video games
Reboot films
Resident Evil (film series)
Screen Gems films
2020s Canadian films
2020s American films
2020s British films